Richard Vaughan Barnewall (1779/1780 – 29 January 1842) was an English lawyer and law reporter.

He was the fourth son of Robert, a London merchant reputedly descended from fifteenth century Irish chief justice Sir Nicholas Barnewall, and Sophia, daughter of Captain Silvester Barnewall, himself uncle to Robert Barnewall. The Baronies of Trimlestown and Kingsland were held by various members of his family.

Barnewall was a lifelong Roman Catholic, educated at Stonyhurst College and the University of Edinburgh. A pupil of Richard Blick, a notable special pleader, Barnewall was called to the bar at the Inner Temple in 1806. He began his practice on the home circuit and at the Surrey quarter sessions.

Barnewall is best remembered as a careful and accurate reporter of the King's Bench, particularly in association with:
Edward Hall Alderson, (1817-1822);
Sir Cresswell Cresswell, (1822-1830); and
John Leycester Adolphus, (1830-1834).

Barnewell retired in 1834, having inherited property from the baroness de Montesquieu. He died at his chambers at 13 King's Bench Walk, never having married, being buried in Paddington churchyard.

References

Bibliography
Obituaries:
Annual Register (1842), 247–8
Gentleman's Magazine, 2nd ser., 17 (1842) 331–2

[Anon.] (1930) Stonyhurst Magazine, 20(285), Feb

Rigg, J. M.  (2004) "Barnewall, Richard Vaughan (1779/80–1842)", rev. Jonathan Harris, Oxford Dictionary of National Biography, Oxford University Press, accessed 8 August 2007 (subscription required)

18th-century births
1842 deaths
English barristers
English Roman Catholics
People educated at Stonyhurst College